The following is a list of notable people associated with St. Lawrence University, located in the American city of Canton, New York.

Notable alumni

Politics and government
 William A. Barclay (1992), New York State Assemblyman
 Michael Botticelli, Acting Director of the Office of National Drug Control Policy
 Gregory W. Carman (1958), former United States Representative from New York, and U.S. Court of International Trade judge
 Katherine Clark (1985), current member of the United States House of Representatives from Massachusetts
 Susan Collins (1975), current United States Senator of Maine
 John J. Delaney (1914), former member of the United States House of Representatives and Deputy Commissioner of Public Markets
 Domenick L. Gabrielli, New York Supreme Court and New York Court of Appeals
 Joseph Lekuton, elected to the Kenyan Parliament in 2006
 Judy Wakhungu, Kenyan ambassador to France
 George R. Malby, former United States Representative from New York
 Peter McDonough, member of the New Jersey Senate
 Luther F. McKinney (1870), former United States Representative from New Hampshire and United States Ambassador to Colombia
 Peter Michael Pitfield, Canadian politician; held several prominent positions in Canadian national government, including Senator and Clerk of the Privy Council of Canada
 David M. Potts (1932), former United States Representative from New York
 Albert D. Shaw, former United States Representative from New York
 Gerald B. H. Solomon, former United States Representative from New York
 Owen D. Young (1894), industrialist, businessman, lawyer; Democratic candidate for President in 1932; diplomat at the Second Reparations Conference in 1929
 Neil Chatterjee, current chairman of the Federal Energy Regulatory Commission

Academia
 F. King Alexander, former President of Murray State University and California State University, Long Beach current President and Chancellor of Louisiana State University<ref>{{cite web |url=http://sites01.lsu.edu/wp/chancellor/incoming-chancellor-f-king-alexander/ |title=LSU Office of the Chancellor |year=2013 |access-date=2014-01-24 |archive-url=https://web.archive.org/web/20140201171333/http://sites01.lsu.edu/wp/chancellor/incoming-chancellor-f-king-alexander/ |archive-date=2014-02-01 |url-status=dead }}</ref>
 Mark Klett (1974), Regents' Professor of Photography at Arizona State University
 Lorrie Moore (1978), Gertrude Conaway Vanderbilt Professor of English at Vanderbilt University
 Joel Rosenbaum (1957), professor of cell biology at Yale University
 Peter Rutkoff (1964), professor of American Studies at Kenyon College
 George Stade (1955) literary critic, novelist, and professor of literature at Columbia University
 Michael P. Soroka, professor of Sociology at University of San Diego

Media and arts
 Irving Bacheller, pioneered the idea of newspaper syndication and wrote the first best-seller of the 20th century, Eben Holden Dan Buckley, publisher of Marvel Comics and the CEO of Marvel Entertainment's publishing division
 Tom Chiarella, magazine writer, fiction editor for Esquire Magazine Kirk Douglas, actor
 Pete Duel, actor known for his role in the television series Alias Smith and Jones David Dusek, senior writer at Golfweek and USA Today, formerly with Sports Illustrated, Golf Magazine and Tennis Magazine
 J.K. Gannon (1924), wrote "I'll Be Home for Christmas" and the school's alma mater
 Kate Hollanda (1996), associate director at NBC News, ABC News and others. Associate directed the 60th Grammy Awards
 Eliza Putnam Heaton (1860-1919), journalist, editor
 Elizabeth Inness-Brown novelist and professor at Saint Michael's College
 Maurice Kenny, Mohawk poet
 Martha MacCallum, anchor with Fox News Channel; hosts The Live Desk with Martha MacCallum Eleanor Mondale, radio personality, television host, and actor
 Lorrie Moore, short story writer and novelist, and member of the American Academy of Arts and Letters
 Viggo Mortensen (1980), award-winning actor who has appeared in many films, most notably The Lord of the Rings film trilogy
 Nick Penniman (1992), Executive Director of the Huffington Post Investigative Fund; founder and director of the American News Project
 Grace Potter, lead singer of the Hollywood Records recording group Grace Potter and the Nocturnals
 Jeremy Slate, actor
 Elinor Tatum (1993), publisher and Editor in Chief of the New York Amsterdam News Charles Henry Vail (1893), writer on socialism; Universalist clergyman
 Chester Watson, opera singer

Athletics
 Jamie Baker (1989), professional hockey player; radio color commentator for the San Jose Sharks
 Thomas Vonn, former processional skier. 
 Mike Barnett, former NHL player agent
 Fritz Bedford, competitive swimmer
 Jim Berkman (1982), all-time winningest coach in NCAA men's lacrosse history; head coach at nine-time national champion Salisbury University
 Greg Boester, former Olympic ski jumper
 Geoff Boss (1988), professional racing driver in ChampCar, Indy Lights, and IMSA
 Brandon Bollig (2012), former professional ice hockey player for the Chicago Blackhawks and Calgary Flames
 Mo Cassara, head coach of Hofstra University men's basketball
 Gary Croteau (1968), NHL left wing
 Emmett Davis (1981), head men's basketball coach at Colgate University
 Mike Hurlbut, former NHL player; associate head men's hockey coach at St. Lawrence University
 Dave Jennings (1974), former NFL player; former radio analyst for the New York Giants and New York Jets
 Mike Keenan, former NHL coach and general manager
 Gina Kingsbury (2004), Olympic gold medalist
 Gary Laskoski, professional ice hockey player for the Los Angeles Kings
 Jacques Martin, NHL coach
 Ron Mason (1962), coach and athletic director at Michigan State University
 Brian McFarlane (1955), Canadian television sportscaster and writer
 Mike McKenna, former NHL goaltender with multiple clubs; television analyst for the Vegas Golden Knights
 Rich Peverley former NHL player with the Dallas Stars; won the Stanley Cup in 2011 while playing for the Boston Bruins. Now player development coordinator for the Dallas Stars
 Dan Rusanowsky (1983), radio play-by-play announcer with the NHL's San Jose Sharks (1991–present)
 Hal Schumacher (1933), signed as a pitcher with the New York Giants while still a student
 Randy Sexton (1982), current Assistant General Manager for the NHL's Buffalo Sabres and GM of affiliate Rochester Americans
 Ray Shero (1984), current GM of the New Jersey Devils hockey team
 Greg Sutton (soccer) (1999), goalkeeper in Major League Soccer
 Bill Torrey (1957), member of Hockey Hall of Fame (1995). Four Stanley Cups as GM of the New York Islanders
 John Zeiler, former professional ice hockey player for the Los Angeles Kings
 Wayne Morgan (1973), Head basketball Coach Iowa State University, Long Beach State University

Business
 A. Barton Hepburn (Honorary 1906), United States Comptroller of the Currency; President of Chase National Bank 
 Greg Boester, former Olympic ski jumper and banker at JPMorgan Chase
 Geoff Molson, Canadian businessman and current president and chief executive officer and co-owner of the National Hockey League's Montreal Canadiens, Evenko, Bell Centre and L'Équipe Spectra.  He is a member of the Molson family of Canada.
 James Marshall Reilly, entrepreneur; author of Shake The World: It's Not About Finding a Job, It's About Creating a Life and One Great Speech: Secrets, Stories, and Perks of the Paid Speaking Industry (And How You Can Break In)'' 
 Owen D. Young (1894), headed General Electric; founded the Radio Corporation of America
 Philip Young (1931), son of Owen D. Young; Dean of Columbia Business School; United States Ambassador to the Netherlands

Religion and philosophy
 Olympia Brown (1863), first woman to graduate from a regularly established theological school
 Frederick F. Campbell (1965), current Roman Catholic Bishop of Columbus
 Robert W. Castle, Episcopal priest, activist and actor
 Mariana Thompson Folsom (1870), Universalist minister, woman suffragist 
 Lorenza Haynes (1874), minister, librarian, school founder
 Daniel W. Herzog (1971), former Bishop of Albany, New York
 Florence E. Kollock (1848-1925), Universalist minister and lecturer
 Clarence R. Skinner (1904), Universalist minister, teacher, and Dean of the Crane School of Theology at Tufts University
 Mary Traffarn Whitney (1872), minister, editor, social reformer, philanthropist, lecturer

Science and technology
 John Clogston, groundbreaking scholar in the area of news media images of people with disabilities
 Albert P. Crary, pioneer polar geophysicist and glaciologist; first person to set foot on both the North and South Poles
 Karen R. Hitchcock, biologist; former Principal of Queen's University, Kingston, Ontario, Canada
 John O'Shea, Scientific Director at the National Institute of Arthritis and Musculoskeletal and Skin Diseases
 Derrick Pitts, Chief Astronomer and Planetarium Director for the Franklin Institute
 Les Roberts (1983), epidemiologist

See also

 Theological School of St. Lawrence University

Notes

External links
 St. Lawrence University Alumni Association

St. Lawrence University